Toy Show The Musical is a musical based on The Late Late Toy Show. It was created and developed by RTÉ, the national broadcaster of Ireland. The musical focuses on a twelve-year-old girl, Nell Mooney, who goes on an adventure as she and her family prepare for the Toy Show.

Toy Show The Musical opened at the Convention Centre in Dublin, on 10 December 2022 and is set to  run until 31 December 2022.

Background
On 13 May 2022, Raidió Teilifís Éireann (RTÉ) announced details of a Christmas musical for the first time, with Toy Show The Musical to premiere at the Convention Centre in Dublin from 10 to 31 December 2022. Shortly after the announcement, casting opened for the musical, with girls aged between 11 and 16 being sought to play the lead role.

The full cast was announced throughout October and November 2022 which featured actors from Derry Girls, Fair City and Emmerdale in the lead adult roles, while three girls would take turns to play the lead role of Nell.

Speaking to the Irish Examiner in November 2022, The Late Late Show producers Jane Murphy and Katherine Drohan revealed that they had first thought about the idea prior to COVID-19. During the pandemic, Murphy and Drohan worked together and developed a two-year plan.

Production history
In May 2022, RTÉ announced its intention to stage its first musical based on The Late Late Toy Show, engaging Lisa Tierney-Keogh as playwright, Séimí Campbell as director, RuthAnne Cunningham and Harry Blake as the composer, Sarah Travis as musical supervisor and orchestrator, James Cousins as choreographer, Colin Richmond as set and costume designer and Paul Keogan as lighting designer. 

The musical will premiere at the Convention Centre, with an official opening on 10 December 2022. It will run until 31 December 2022.

Cast and characters

References

External links
Toy Show The Musical website

2022 musicals
Plays set in Ireland
Plays set in Dublin (city)
Irish musicals
Christmas in the Republic of Ireland
The Musical, Toy Show